Mangelia cingulata is a species of sea snail, a marine gastropod mollusk in the family Mangeliidae.

Description
The length of the shell attains 7.7 mm, its diameter 2.6 mm.

The solid, brownish shell is turriform. The apex is broken off, but 10-11 whorls appear to have existed. These are steeply angulated with a suture impressed below the lowest strongest spiral. Three such spirals are present on the whorls in increasing strength. Another four of decreasing strength show a slightly larger interstice on the body whorl. Between the spiral ribs are fine, extensively extended ribs in the direction of growth, but they become mostly indistinct by a fibrous cuticle.

Distribution
This marine species occurs off Uruguay and South Georgia.

References

External links
  Tucker, J.K. 2004 Catalog of recent and fossil turrids (Mollusca: Gastropoda). Zootaxa 682:1-1295.

cingulata
Gastropods described in 1908